Rape on the Installment Plan is the first album by The Heroine Sheiks. It was released on September 20, 2000, by Reptilian Records.

Critical reception
AllMusic wrote that "from this radioactive sea-foam of New York art-scum noise -- from guitarist Norman Westberg -- and left-field Midwestern acid-damaged punk rock -- from vocalist Shannon Selberg -- comes a wacko, purely crystallized noise rock revival album."

Track listing

Personnel 
The Heroine Sheiks
John Fell – drums
Scott Hill – keyboards
George Porfiris – bass guitar
Shannon Selberg – vocals, keyboards, bugle
Norman Westberg – guitar
Production and additional personnel
Greg Gordon – production, engineering
The Heroine Sheiks – production
Joe Hogan – engineering
Doug Milton – mastering

References

External links 
 

2000 albums
The Heroine Sheiks albums